The 1990 European Promotion Cup for Men was the third edition of this tournament. It was hosted in Cardiff, Wales and Iceland won the tournament after beating Cyprus in the final game.

Preliminary round

Group A

Group B

Classification games

Final round

Bracket

Final

Final ranking

External links
FIBA Archive

1990
1990–91 in European basketball
International sports competitions hosted by Wales
Basketball in Wales
International basketball competitions hosted by the United Kingdom
1990–91 in British basketball
1990 in Welsh sport
European Promotion Cup